Adrian Ropes (8 May 1941 – 11 March 2004) was an Egyptian-born English television actor. He appeared in British television series Emergency – Ward 10, The Human Jungle, The Avengers, Randall and Hopkirk, Budgie and others.

Acting credits

References

External links

1941 births
2004 deaths
English male television actors
Male actors from Cairo
20th-century English male actors
21st-century English male actors